The 1949–50 Iraq FA Kirkuk First Division was the second season of the Iraq FA Kirkuk League (the top division of football in Kirkuk from 1948 to 1973) organised by the Kirkuk branch of the Iraq Football Association. Unlike the previous season, Kirkuk's teams were split into two divisions from this season with seven teams in the top-flight and eight teams in the second-tier. The First Division started on the weekend of 5–6 November 1949, and Al-Dhahab Al-Aswad retained the league title with five victories and one defeat. The number of teams in the First Division was increased to nine for the 1950–51 season.

League table
The outcome of the Armenian Relief Corps v. Al-Firqa Al-Thaniya match is not available.

Results

References

External links
 Iraqi Football Website

Iraq FA Kirkuk League seasons
Iraq
1949 in Iraq
1950 in Iraq